Project Indigo was started by India in 1962. An agreement was signed between India and Switzerland to develop an intermediate-range surface-to-air missile (SAM). Indigo was discontinued in later years without achieving full success. Project Indigo led to Project Devil, to develop short-range surface-to-air missile in the 1970s. Project Devil itself led to the later development of the Prithvi missile in the 1980s.

Background
The basic rocket research in the 1960s in India was done under Project Indigo. Project Indigo was an Indo-Swiss agreement to develop intermediate-range surface-to-air missiles that was scrapped when India opted for Soviet SA-2 missiles in 1962.

See also
Project Devil
SS-45 Missile

References

External links
 frontierindia.net Project Devil 
 frontierindia.net The SS-45 

Ballistic missiles of India
Surface-to-air missiles of India